Hiyoshi Station (日吉駅) may refer to:
Hiyoshi Station (Kyoto) in Nantan, Kyoto Prefecture, Japan, connected with the JR San'in Main Line
Hiyoshi Station (Kanagawa) in Kōhoku-ku, Yokohama, Japan, connected with the Tōkyu Tōyoko Line, the Tōkyu Meguro Line and the Yokohama Subway Green Line